The Kirlian Witness is a 1979 American thriller/supernatural film written and directed by Jonathan Sarno. The film stars Nancy Snyder, Nancy Boykin, Joel Colodner, Ted Le Plat, Lawrence Tierney and Maia Danziger. The film was released on June 6, 1979, by Paramount Pictures.

Plot
Rilla's sister, Laurie, is dead, murdered on the moonlit rooftop above her apartment.  There are no clues and no fingerprints.  Yet there is a "witness".  If Rilla can communicate with it, she can expose a murderer, but that communication could cost her her marriage, her sanity and her life.

Laurie's childhood affinity for plant life had developed into a remarkable telepathic bond, one that she had been researching exhaustively.  When she is murdered, the only "witness" is her favourite houseplant.  Rilla insists that the plant holds the key to the killer's identity.  The police are openly skeptical of her theory.  So Rilla becomes a one-person private detective agency.

Through the use of Kirlian photography, - a type of X-Ray process that can reveal the psychological aura of its subject - she compiles persuasive evidence.  Still, her obsessive investigation is alienating her husband and upsetting her life.  Her own telepathic communication with the plant is triggering a series of terrifying dreams of her sister's death and what she cannot distinguish in the prophetic nightmares is the face of the murderer who is about to kill again.

Cast 
Nancy Snyder as Rilla
Nancy Boykin as Laurie
Joel Colodner as Robert
Ted Le Plat as Dusty
Lawrence Tierney as Detective
Maia Danziger as Claire

Background 
Among the wilder branches of pseudoscience to gain popularity during the 1970's was Kirlian photography, which supposedly allowed researchers to document emotional reactions from plants during exposure to stimuli. Kirlian photography is rumored to be the inspiration and basis for the film.

References

External links 
 

1979 films
American thriller films
1970s thriller films
Paramount Pictures films
1970s English-language films
1970s American films